Veronika Hesse (née Schmidt; born 24 August 1952 in Harzgerode) is a former East German cross-country skier who competed from 1974 to 1982. She won two 4 × 5 km relay medals at the Winter Olympics with a gold in Lake Placid and a bronze in Innsbruck.

Schmidt also won a complete set medals at the FIS Nordic World Ski Championships with a gold in the 20 km (1980), a silver in the 4 × 5 km relay (1974), and a bronze in the 4 × 5 km relay (1982).

Cross-country skiing results
All results are sourced from the International Ski Federation (FIS).

Olympic Games
 2 medals – (1 gold, 1 bronze)

World Championships
 3 medals – (1 gold, 1 silver, 1 bronze)

World Cup

Season standings

Team podiums
 1 podium

Note:   Until the 1999 World Championships, World Championship races were included in the World Cup scoring system.

References

External links
 
 
 World Championship results 
 
 

1952 births
Living people
Cross-country skiers at the 1976 Winter Olympics
Cross-country skiers at the 1980 Winter Olympics
Olympic medalists in cross-country skiing
East German female cross-country skiers
FIS Nordic World Ski Championships medalists in cross-country skiing
Medalists at the 1976 Winter Olympics
Medalists at the 1980 Winter Olympics
Olympic gold medalists for East Germany
Olympic bronze medalists for East Germany
People from Harzgerode
Sportspeople from Saxony-Anhalt